Edgware Road is a London Underground station on the Bakerloo line, located in the City of Westminster. It is between Paddington and Marylebone stations on the line and falls within Travelcard zone 1. The station is located on the north-east corner of the junction of Edgware Road, Harrow Road and Marylebone Road. It is adjacent to the Marylebone flyover.

A separate station of the same name but served by the Circle, District and Hammersmith & City lines is nearby, to the south of Marylebone Road.

History
Edgware Road station was opened on 15 June 1907 by the Baker Street and Waterloo Railway (BS&WR, now the Bakerloo line) when it extended its line from the temporary northern terminus at Marylebone. In common with other early stations of the lines owned by the Underground Electric Railways Company of London, the station was designed by architect Leslie Green with an ox-blood red glazed terracotta façade. The BS&WR had parliamentary approval to continue the line to Paddington station, but the approved route, which curved under the main line station and ended under the junction of Sussex Gardens and Sussex Place on a south-easterly heading, was not suitable for the company's plan to extend west or north-west from Paddington. The BS&WR chose not to construct the tunnels west of Edgware Road whilst it considered alternatives.

In 1908 the BS&WR considered a joint scheme with the North West London Railway (NWLR) to build a tube line from Edgware Road station to Cricklewood via Kilburn. The NWLR had obtained permission to build a line along Edgware Road from Cricklewood to Marble Arch in 1899, and had received approval for an additional section from Marble Arch to Victoria in 1906, but it had been unable to raise the money to build the line. To make use of the BS&WR's existing permission for the line to Paddington, Edgware Road station was to be provided with a second pair of platforms to enable the operation of a shuttle service between Paddington and Edgware Road. The scheme was rejected and the line was not built.

Work started in August 1911 and the extension opened on 1 December 1913. When the station opened, its narrow frontage was in a row of shops, but the buildings to the south of the station were demolished in the 1960s to enable the flyover to be built, leaving the station as one of two isolated buildings. Originally, an exit from the station was provided in the adjacent Bell Street. Although this is no longer used the building provides office accommodation for the station managers.

In 1983, London Transport proposed to close the station on the basis that the passenger lifts, which at the time were 77 years old, needed to be replaced at a cost of more than £3 million. The proposal was dropped following a request by the GLC for the matter to be reconsidered. 

In September 2007, there was a proposal by London Assembly member Murad Qureshi to rename this station Church Street Market, as this would end the confusion between this station and its namesake on the Circle, District and Hammersmith & City lines.

Between 25 May and 21 December 2013, the station closed temporarily for lift maintenance work.

Connections
London Buses routes 6, 16, 18, 98 and 332 and night routes N16, N18 and N98 serve the station.

Notes and references

Notes

References

Bibliography

External links

London Transport Museum Photographic Archive

Bakerloo line stations
Tube stations in the City of Westminster
Former Baker Street and Waterloo Railway stations
Railway stations in Great Britain opened in 1907
Leslie Green railway stations